The Paragon is a luxury shopping complex located in the Orchard Road area of Singapore.

Background
It was redeveloped in the late 1990s, transforming it into a modern glass-covered building. It has been described as “posh and sleek”.

In January 2008, Paragon was embarked on an $82 million facelift which included a $37 million land premium to expand its commercial space on the nearby space which was once a former site of The Promenade as its new wing, which saw the addition of three more floors of office and medical space as well as new retails stores.

Led by the architecture firm DP Architects, the makeover was completed in December 2008. Paragon emerged with a contemporary facade.

The renovation was also in step with the URA's call to building owners to create more interesting and unique building facades to enhance the vibrancy of Orchard Road. In January 2017, Forbes recognized Paragon as one of the top five shopping malls in Singapore.

Stores
Paragon is known for its cluster of flagship stores of international high fashion labels such as Tod's, Prada, Miu Miu, Jimmy Choo, Anteprima, Dunhill, Etro, Ermenegildo Zegna and Burberry. Gucci opened its flagship store with five storeys of shopfront presence on the facade in February 2010. Complementing fashion are accessories that include watches, pens and jewellery retailers such as Hublot, Cortina Watch, Larry Jewelry and Loang and Noi, among others, as well as crystal specialist Liuligongfang and handcrafted porcelain Lladró.

Paragon's tenants include Metro departmental store, Toys "R" Us, Marks & Spencer and CS Fresh Gold.

There are several restaurants in the shopping centre, ranging from the moderately priced Thai Express to high-end Imperial Treasure Super Peking Duck Restaurant, as well as the one-Michelin-starred Crystal Jade Golden Palace.

Paragon Medical
Paragon also houses a 20-storey medical and office tower atop the Paragon shopping podium.

Location and accessibility
Paragon is located in Orchard Road between the Somerset and Orchard MRT stations.

References

Singapore Press Holdings
Shopping malls in Singapore
Orchard Road
Orchard, Singapore
1998 establishments in Singapore